The Association of Technology, Management and Applied Engineering (ATMAE) (formerly known as the National Association of Industrial Technology) sets standards for academic program accreditation, personal certification and professional development for educators and industry professionals involved in integrating technology, leadership and design. Its primary mission is faculty, students and industry professionals dedicated to solving complex technological problems and developing the competitive technologist and applied engineering workforce.

Definitions 

Industrial Technology is the field concerned with the application of basic engineering principles and technical skills in support of industrial engineers and managers. Industrial Technology degreed programs typically include instruction in optimization theory, human factors, organizational behavior, industrial processes, industrial planning procedures, computer applications, and report and presentation preparation.

Technology Management is the field concerned with the supervision of personnel across the technical spectrum and a wide variety of complex technological systems. Technology Management degreed programs typically include instruction in production and operations management, project management, computer applications, quality control, safety and health issues, statistics, and general management principles.

Operations Management is the field concerned with managing and directing the physical and/or technical functions of a firm or organization, particularly those relating to development, production, and manufacturing. Operations Management degreed programs typically include instruction in principles of general management, manufacturing and production systems, plant management, equipment maintenance management, production control, industrial labor relations and skilled trades supervision, strategic manufacturing policy, systems analysis, productivity analysis and cost control, and materials planning.

Engineering Management is the field concerned with the application of engineering principles to the planning and operational management of industrial and manufacturing operations, and Engineering Managers are prepared to plan and manage such operations. Engineering Management degreed programs typically include instruction in accounting, engineering economy, financial management, industrial and human resources management, industrial psychology, management information systems, mathematical modeling and optimization, quality control, operations research, safety and health issues, and environmental program management.

Applied Engineering (field) is the field concerned with the application of management, design, and technical skills for the design and integration of systems, the execution of new product designs, the improvement of manufacturing processes, and the management and direction of physical and/or technical functions of a firm or organization. Applied Engineering degreed programs typically include instruction in basic engineering principles, project management, industrial processes, production and operations management, systems integration and control, quality control, and statistics.

Engineering Technology is the field concerned with the application of basic engineering principles and technical skills in support of engineers engaged in a wide variety of projects. Engineering Technology degreed programs typically include instruction in various engineering support functions for research, production, and operations, and applications to specific engineering specialties.

Certification 

The ATMAE certification program recognizes individual certified members who have met certain professional standards to become certified and to maintain their certification. ATMAE currently offers seven certification programs. The Certified Technology Manager program, CTM & CSTM (formerly called Certified Industrial Technologist, CIT & CSIT), the Certified Manufacturing Specialist program, CMS & CSMS, the Certified Technical Professional program, CTP & CSTP, the Certified in Engineering Graphics program, CEG & CSEG, the Certified Controls Engineer, CCE & CSCE, Microelectro Mechanical Systems Foundation Certification (MFC) and the Certified Lean Six Sigma (CLSSYB, CLSSGB, CLSSBB, CLSSMBB).

Certified in Engineering Graphics (CEG / CSEG): The Certified in Engineering Graphics program is for individuals with a background in the expression of industrial design ideas through engineering graphics, including geometric construction, orthographic views, and standardized annotations. The exam is geared toward the industry standard expression of design ideas as contract documents – used within the industrial enterprise in areas such as manufacturing process planning, quality control, purchasing, and other areas of expertise.

Certified Manufacturing Specialist (CMS / CSMS): The Certified Manufacturing Specialist (CMS) program is geared toward programs with a strong manufacturing emphasis and the exam was developed with help from ATMAE members working in such programs.

Certified Technology Manager (CTM / CSTM) (Formerly Certified Industrial Technologist, CIT / CSIT): The Certified Technology Manager (CTM) program is based on a broad-based multi-subject exam, updated from the old Certified Industrial Technologist exam, which can be used by many technology and technology management programs, regardless of emphasis.

Certified Technical Professional (CTP / CSTP): The Certified Technical Professional (CTP) program is designed to serve graduates of both 2-Year and 4-Year Programs. The exam is broad-based, geared to technical programs without a management component that result in either an associate (AS, AAS) degree or a baccalaureate (BS, BA) degree.

Certified Controls Engineer (CCE / CSCE): The Certified Controls Engineer (CCE) program is designed to serve graduates of 4-Year Programs. The multi subject exam emphasizes automation and control system applicable to a board swath of industrial applications.

Microelectro Mechanical Systems Foundation Certification (MFC): The MEMS Foundation Certification (MFC) program is designed to serve students from 2-Year, 4-Year, and advanced secondary programs. The exam is broad-based, and covers foundational topics related to the background, theory, and skills involved in microsystems fabrication. The exam is geared to individuals who have completed the nine MEMS Foundations online short courses offered free by the Support Center for Microsystems Education (SCME).

Initial CCE, CEG, CMS, CTM, and CTP Certification Eligibility: Individuals meeting the following criteria are eligible to be certified by ATMAE in the Certified Controls Engineer (CSE), Certified in Engineering Graphics (CEG), Certified Technology Manager (CTM), Certified Manufacturing Specialist (CMS), Certified Technical Professional (CTP) programs:

Pass Examination: The applicant must pass the CCE, CEG, CMS, CTM, or CTP examination,
and 
Education: 
Degree: The applicant must have a technical, technology, or engineering-related degree (AA/AS, BA/BS, MA/MS, or Doctorate), or 
Equivalency: Equivalent educational qualifications as determined by the Certification Officer based on formal education and professional experience or 
Impending Graduation: Applicants are also eligible in the final year prior to receipt of a qualifying degree, if impending graduation is verified on the application by an academic advisor. 
and 
Employed or Pursuing Graduate Studies: 
Be professionally employed in a capacity related to technical, technology, or engineering disciplines, either in academia, business, or government, or 
Be pursuing graduate studies after obtaining the initial technical, technology, or engineering-related degree used as the qualifying degree for certification. 
and 
ATMAE Membership: The applicant must be an ATMAE member or must join ATMAE as part of the certification application process.

Senior-Level CSCE, CSEG, CSMS, CSTM, and CSTP Certification Eligibility: Individuals meeting the following criteria are eligible to be certified by ATMAE in the higher-level "senior" certification programs, Certified Senior Controls Engineer (CSCE), Certified Senior in Engineering Graphics (CSEG). Certified Senior Manufacturing Specialist (CSMS), Certified Senior Technology Manager (CSTM), or Certified Senior Technical Professional (CSTP): 
Currently Certified as a CEG, CMS, CTM, or CTP or are eligible for those programs: The applicant must be eligible for (i.e., passed exam, and has education, employment, and ATMAE membership prerequisites) or be currently certified in the CEG, CMS, CTM, or CTP programs. 
Report Minimum Continuing Education / Professional Development Activity Requirement: The applicant must also report thirty (30) Professional Development Units of continuing education activity that were completed prior to the application (within prior three years). 
NOTE: Coursework completed in pursuit of the academic degree used as the qualifying degree for CCE, CEG, CMS, CTM, or CTP certification cannot be used to fulfill this requirement.

Recognition

The ATMAE accreditation is recognized by the Council for Higher Education Accreditation also known as CHEA.

ATMAE Scope of Recognition:
Associate, baccalaureate, and master's degree programs in technology, applied technology, engineering
technology, and technology-related disciplines delivered by national or regional accredited institutions in
the United States.(2011)

References

External links 
 ATMAE official website

Professional certification in engineering
Engineering societies based in the United States
Professional associations based in the United States
School accreditors